Halaku may refer to:

Hulagu Khan or Halaku Khan, Mongol ruler and grandson of Genghis Khan
Halaku (film), a 1956 Indian Hindi-language film about the ruler
Halaku or Slayers, role-playing game characters from Demon: The Fallen
Halaku, role-playing game character from Werewolf: The Forsaken